Lithium triflate (lithium triflouromethanesulfonate or LiOTf) is a salt with the chemical formula LiCF3SO3. It is composed of the lithium cation (Li+) and triflate anion (CF3SO3−; TfO−). It is very hygroscopic. The salt is used in lithium-ion battery production.

References

Triflates
Lithium salts